Władysław Stachurski (27 March 1945 – 13 March 2013) was a Polish football player and manager.

As a player he was best known for his time at Legia Warsaw and was capped eight times for Poland, scoring one goal. He retired aged 28 due to a career ending injury.

He made his name as a manager, most notably with Zawisza Bydgoszcz, Legia Warsaw, Widzew Łódź, Poland and Świt Nowy Dwór Mazowiecki.

References

1945 births
2013 deaths
Polish footballers
Poland international footballers
Legia Warsaw players
Polish football managers
Zawisza Bydgoszcz managers
Legia Warsaw managers
Widzew Łódź managers
Poland national football team managers
People from Kielce County
Sportspeople from Świętokrzyskie Voivodeship
Association football defenders